Freak Out is a 2004 British horror comedy film. It was directed by Christian James and written by him and Dan Palmer.

Plot
When die-hard horror movie fan Merv Doody (James Heathcote) finds a dangerous escaped mental patient at his doorstep, he has a panic attack but regains his cool when he realizes the potential in the hapless killer. Merv invites best pal Onkey (Dan Palmer) over and the two soon set about executing a makeover on the maniac to create the ultimate slasher movie villain. Outfitted with a snazzy orange jumpsuit, an appropriately menacing hockey mask, and armed with a spatula, Merv and Onkey's murderous creation soon sets out on a violent rampage that sends the small-town citizens of Redwater Cove running for their lives. Upon realizing that they are the only ones who can put an end to the bloody killing spree, the longtime horror fans prepare to put their vast knowledge of slasher disposal to the ultimate test.

Cast

Production
Freak Out began filming on 20 October 1999, and ended 12 June 2003 with an estimated budget of £30,000. The film was shot at both Bournemouth, Dorset, England, UK, and London, England, UK.

Reception
The film garnered mostly positive reviews from critics.

Awards
In 2004, Director Christian James, won the Commendation Award during the Festival of Fantastic Films, in UK. That same year, he won the Best Genre Cross Over award at the Rhode Island International Horror Film Festival.

External links

 
 
 

2004 horror films
British comedy horror films
2000s comedy horror films
2004 films
Parodies of horror
2004 comedy films
2000s English-language films
2000s British films